Passage Island or Duncan Island is an uninhabited island of the Andaman Islands. It belongs to the South Andaman administrative district, part of the Indian union territory of Andaman and Nicobar Islands.

Geography
The island belongs to the Rutland Archipelago and is located between South Cinque Island ( to the north) and West Sister Island ( to the southeast). 
Duncan Passage is just south of this island, separating it from Little Andaman Island.

Administration
Politically, Passage Island is part of Port Blair Taluk.

References 

Islands of the Andaman and Nicobar Islands
Uninhabited islands of India
Islands of India
Islands of the Bay of Bengal